Wikland is a surname. Notable people with the surname include:

Anna Wikland, Swedish business executive
Ilon Wikland (born 1930), Estonian-born Swedish artist and illustrator